The Warriorr is a 2022 Indian action film directed by N. Lingusamy and produced by Srinivasa Silver Screen. It is shot simultaneously in Telugu and Tamil languages. The film stars Ram Pothineni, Aadhi Pinisetty, Krithi Shetty, Akshara Gowda, and Nadhiya. The film score is composed by Devi Sri Prasad.

Linguswamy began contemplating a Telugu–Tamil bilingual film in 2016 which would make his directorial debut in Telugu cinema. The film was announced in February 2021 with Pothineni as the lead. Principal Photography for the film in July 2021 and concluded in May 2022 with filming taking place primarily in Hyderabad and Chennai.

The Warriorr was released on 14 July 2022 and opened to generally negative reviews from critics and audience alike. It was a huge commercial failure, grossing  crore over a budget of  crore.

Plot
Satya is an MBBS graduate, who relocates to Kurnool/Madurai with his mother as he gets a job as doctor in a government hospital in Kurnool. He meets RJ Mahalakshmi, who is popularly known as "Whistle" Mahalakshmi, and soon develops feelings for her. He also learns about Guru, a ruthless gangster, who rules the city with an iron fist. Satya lodges a complaint against Guru, whose company has been manufacturing poisonous saline and is involved in the medical mafia.

This resulted in the death of three children, but the police do not pay heed as they are afraid of Guru's atrocities. Guru learns of this and brutally thrashes Satya in front of the Konda Reddy Fort and hangs him. However, he is saved by his hospital dean, Robert, in the nick of time. He tells Satya to never return to the city. Satya leaves the city, along with his mother and pregnant sister. Two years later, Satya returns back to Kurnool/Madurai, this time, as the city's DSP. Satya wages a war between Guru and his gangsters, and also meets Maha. When Satya searches for the hospital dean Dr. Robert he comes to know from Dr. Rahim that Robert had died in an accident.

Satya becomes suspicious that Guru must be the reason for his untimely death. Later, his appeal for re-postmortem of Robert gets approved but upon opening Robert's grave instead of Robert, Rahim's dead body is found in it. Enraged, Guru reveals to Satya that he killed Robert when the latter helped Satya escape from Kurnool/Madurai and killed Rahim for safeguarding the evidence against him. The next day, Guru contests in the elections, but Satya arrests him on charges of killing Robert, with the help of a pendrive, hidden by Rahim, which contained information and evidence regarding Guru's illegal activities.nAs a result, he is sent to prison. 

Guru's wife Swarna plots to kill Satya by stringing, but instead, Mahalakshmi gets hurt by getting a major cut on her throat as she was following Satya. Satya admits her to the hospital, where he learns that she might not be able to speak again. He gets informed that Guru has been released from prison. After being encouraged by his mother, Satya calls Guru back to the Konda Reddy fort, for a final showdown. After close hand-to-hand combat, Satya kills Guru and hangs him, in the same manner, that Guru hanged him before. After Guru's death, Satya gets married to Maha, where he continues working as a doctor and a police officer.

Cast

Production

Development 
In 2016, Tamil film director Lingusamy announced that he planned to make a bilingual film in Telugu and Tamil, marking his Telugu debut. He first approached Allu Arjun to star in the film, but the film was delayed due to Allu Arjun's busy schedule. In 2019, Havish was cast as the lead, but the film never began production. On 18 February 2021, it was announced that Ram Pothineni was brought on board the film, which was tentatively called RAPO19 with Srinivasa Chitturi producing the film under his banner Srinivasa Silver Screen. The film marks the Tamil debut of Pothineni after Yen Endral Kadhal Enben!, the Tamil version of Endukante... Premanta! (2012), failed to have a theatrical release. In January 2022, the film's title was announced as The Warriorr.

Casting 
In March 2021, it was announced that Krithi Shetty was cast aside Pothineni as the female lead. In July 2021, the makers announced that Aadhi Pinisetty was cast as the main antagonist in the film. In August 2021, it was announced that Akshara Gowda was signed on to play a pivotal role in the film.

Filming 
Principal Photography for the film began on 13 July 2021 in Hyderabad and Chennai. The second schedule of the film was completed in October 2021. The third schedule began in January 2022 and filming was wrapped up at the end of May 2022.

Music 

The film score and soundtrack album of the film is composed by Devi Sri Prasad. The music rights were acquired by Aditya Music.

Release

Theatrical 
In March 2022, it was announced that the film was going to release theatrically on 14 July 2022. The film's pre-release rights were sold for 43.10 crore, the highest for Pothineni's film to date.

Home media 
The television and digital distribution rights were acquired by Star Network respectively. The film started streaming in Telugu on Disney+Hotstar from 11 August 2022.

Reception

Box office
The Warriorr grossed  crore on its opening day, with  crore coming from the states of Andhra Pradesh and Telangana.

Critical response 
The Warriorr met with generally negative reviews from critics. Neeshita Nyayapati of The Times of India rated the film 3 out of 5 stars and wrote "The Warriorr is a masala-laden commercial pot-boiler that’s meant to be watched over a shared bucket of popcorn." A critic for Pinkvilla rated the film 2 out of 5 stars and wrote "Some films are stuck in a time warp. The Warriorr goes beyond. Every nerve ending and blood vessel of the film is stuck in the past". Latha Srinivasan of Firstpost rated the film 1.5 out of 5 stars and wrote "Director Lingusamy's Telugu debut starring Ram Pothineni is a mish-mash of his earlier films. The Warrior loses the battle even before setting foot on the battleground". Balakrishna Ganeshan of The News Minute rated the film 1.5 out of 5 stars and wrote "The story being extremely superficial without any element of reality in it, also makes it a mediocre watch." Janani K of India Today rated the film 1 out of 5 stars and wrote "The Warriorr is a film that has wasted crores of rupees on a story that we saw ages ago. Aadhi does a good job initially, but his role is reduced to a caricature." Manoj Kumar R of The Indian Express rated the film 0.5 out of 5 stars and wrote "Lingusamy has repeated the same movie that he has been making throughout his career with different actors and costumes, including the 'loosu ponnu' archetype". A critic for Behindwoods rated the film 2.5 out of 5 stars and wrote "The Warriorr is a watchable police action entertainer with the hero and villain in fine form." Bhuvanesh Chandar of The Hindu wrote after reviewing the film that "Lingusamy's long journey to find his redemption proves to be longer, and for Ram Pothineni, who wears his heart on the sleeve as Satya, it's another futile attempt and an unlucky debut in Tamil."

References

External links 

2022 multilingual films
Indian action films
Indian multilingual films
Films shot in Hyderabad, India
Films shot in Chennai
Films scored by Devi Sri Prasad
Films directed by N. Lingusamy